The John and Elizabeth Remington House is a historic patterned brick building located at 689 Roadstown Road in Hopewell Township, Cumberland County, New Jersey, United States. The oldest section of the house dates to 1728. It was added to the National Register of Historic Places on July 14, 2015, for its significance in architecture.

See also
 National Register of Historic Places listings in Cumberland County, New Jersey
 List of the oldest buildings in New Jersey

References

Hopewell Township, Cumberland County, New Jersey
Brick buildings and structures
Houses in Cumberland County, New Jersey
Houses on the National Register of Historic Places in New Jersey
National Register of Historic Places in Cumberland County, New Jersey
New Jersey Register of Historic Places